Monkhill  may refer to the following places in England:

 Monkhill, Cumbria is a small village in Cumbria
 Monkhill, West Yorkshire, an area of Pontefract
 Pontefract Monkhill railway station a railway station on the Pontefract Line